Two ships of the United States Navy have been named Banner, after Banner County, Nebraska.

Sources
 

United States Navy ship names